This is a list of settlements in the Larissa regional unit, Greece.

 Achilleio
 Aetolofos
 Agia
 Agia Sophia
 Agioi Anargyroi
 Agios Georgios, Farsala
 Agios Georgios, Kileler
 Agnanteri
 Aigani
 Akri
 Alexandrini
 Amouri
 Ampelakia
 Ampelia
 Ampelonas
 Amygdalea
 Amygdali
 Anatoli
 Anavra
 Argyropouli
 Armenio
 Asprochoma
 Azoros
 Chalki
 Chalkiades
 Chara
 Damasi
 Damasouli
 Dasolofos
 Deleria
 Dendra Tyrnavou
 Dendra, Farsala
 Dilofo, Farsala
 Dilofo, Kileler
 Dimitra
 Dolichi
 Domeniko
 Doxaras
 Drymos
 Elafos
 Elassona
 Elateia
 Eleftheres
 Eleftherio
 Eretria
 Evangelismos
 Evangelismos, Elassona
 Falanni
 Farmaki
 Farsala
 Flampouro
 Galanovrysi
 Galini
 Gerakari
 Gerania
 Giannota
 Giannouli 
 Glafki
 Gonnoi
 Itea
 Kalamaki
 Kallipefki
 Kallithea Elassonos
 Kallithea, Farsala
 Kalochori
 Kalyvia
 Kalyvia Analipseos
 Karitsa
 Karya
 Kastri
 Kato Vasilika
 Katochori
 Kefalovryso
 Kileler
 Kleisoura
 Koilada
 Kokkino Nero
 Kokkinogeio
 Kokkinopilos
 Koutsochero
 Koutsoufliani
 Krania, Elassona
 Kranea, Tempi
 Krannonas
 Krini
 Kritiri
 Kryovrysi
 Kyparissos
 Kypselochori
 Larissa
 Lefki
 Livadi
 Lofos, Elassona
 Lofos, Farsala
 Loutro, Elassona
 Loutro, Larissa
 Lygaria
 Lykoudi
 Magoula
 Makrychori
 Mandra
 Marmarini
 Mavrovouni
 Megalo Eleftherochori
 Mega Evydrio
 Mega Monastiri
 Megalovryso
 Melia
 Melissa
 Melissochori
 Melivoia
 Mesochori
 Metaxochori
 Mikro Vouno
 Mikrolithos
 Milea
 Moschochori
 Myra
 Namata
 Narthaki
 Nea Lefki
 Nees Karyes
 Neo Perivoli
 Neraida
 Neromyloi
 Nessonas
 Nikaia
 Niki
 Olympiada
 Omolio
 Omorfochori
 Ossa
 Palaiokastro
 Palaiopyrgos
 Paliampela
 Paliaskia
 Parapotamos
 Perichora
 Petroto
 Platanoulia
 Platykampos
 Polydameio
 Polyneri
 Potamia
 Pournari
 Praitori
 Prinias
 Psychiko
 Pyrgetos
 Pythio
 Rachoula
 Rapsani
 Revmatia
 Rodia
 Sarantaporo
 Sitochoro
 Skiti
 Sklithro
 Skopia, Elassona
 Skopia, Farsala
 Skotoussa
 Sotirio
 Sotiritsa
 Sparmos
 Spilia
 Stavros
 Stefanovouno
 Stomio 
 Strintzios
 Sykaminea
 Sykia
 Sykourio
 Tempi
 Terpsithea
 Tsapournia
 Tsaritsani
 Tyrnavos 
 Valanida
 Vamvakou
 Varkos
 Vasilis
 Verdikoussa
 Vlachogianni
 Vounaina
 Vryotopos
 Vrysia
 Ypereia
 Zappeio
 Zoodochos Pigi

By municipality

See also
List of towns and villages in Greece

 
Larissa